LDS Motion Picture Studios (MPS) is a film studio based in Provo, Utah, and is a directly-managed division of the Church of Jesus Christ of Latter-day Saints (LDS Church).

The MPS is part of the LDS Church's media production division, which includes producers, editors, animators, sound stages, editing bays, and a collection of 19th-century buildings on a backlot.

History
It began as the Brigham Young University (BYU) MPS in 1953, led by Wetzel Whitaker. LDS Church president David O. McKay worked with Ernest L. Wilkinson and others to open the studio, appointing Whitaker as head. Originally the studio was located in a building called the Green Barn where BYU's student center is now located.

During Whitaker's 22-year term at the MPS, a host of films were created.  Some were privately funded, but most were created at the request LDS Church departments.

In 1991, the MPS separated from BYU and became a directly-operated function of LDS Church, as part of the church's Audio Visual Department.

MPS South Campus
The MPS South Campus, in Elberta, Utah, was approved by the church's First Presidency in 2010 and construction began on a set of biblical Jerusalem. Elberta, population less than 1,000, was chosen because of the surrounding area's similarity to Jerusalem’s geography—hills, plains, cedar trees, and a stream. 

Lynn G. Robbins, executive director of the church's Media Services Department, was instrumental in the creation of the MPS South Campus.

In 2013, the LDS Church released several scenes of Jesus Christ's life that were filmed there as part of the New Testament film project.

In 2017, production started on a visual library producing a series of films from the Book of Mormon.

Fire at the MPS building
In 2014, a morning fire, caused when an electrical box exploded on top of the studio, resulted in power outage and a fire. Occupants evacuated the building, the Provo City Fire Department soon put out the fire, and no injuries were reported.

See also
 Johnny Lingo
 The Mailbox
 The Testaments of One Fold and One Shepherd

References

Additional reading

.

External links

 The Church of Jesus Christ of Latter-day Saints Official site

1953 establishments in Utah
Brigham Young University
Mormon cinema
 LDS Motion Picture Studios
Organizations established in 1953
Properties of the Church of Jesus Christ of Latter-day Saints
Film production companies of the United States